Casanova's is a 2020 Dutch film directed by Jamel Aattache. The film won the Golden Film award after having sold 100,000 tickets. It was the sixth highest-grossing Dutch film of 2020. It was also the seventh best visited Dutch film of 2020.

Tygo Gernandt, Jim Bakkum and Lieke van Lexmond play roles in the film.

References

External links 
 

2020 films
2020s Dutch-language films
Dutch comedy films
2020 comedy films
Films directed by Jamel Aattache